The Shillong Accord of 1975 was an agreement signed between the Government of India, also referred to as the Federal government, or Union government, or Central government of India, and Nagaland's underground government, also referred to as the Naga Federal government, or Naga guerillas, or Naga rebels, to accept the supremacy of Constitution of India without condition, surrender their arms and renounce their demand for the secession of Nagaland from India.

This historic agreement was signed at Shillong, Meghalaya, on 11 November 1975; thus, the name Shillong Accord of 1975.

Representatives
 The Indian government was represented by Lallan Prasad Singh, Governor of Nagaland. The governor was assisted by M L Kampani , Joint secretary in the Ministry of Home Affairs(MHA), and by two advisors for Nagaland—M. Ramunny and H. Zopianga.
 The Nagaland's underground organisations were represented by leaders including I. Temjenba, S. Dahru, Veenyiyl Rhakho, Z. Ramyo, M. Assa, and Kevi Yalie—younger brother of Angami Zapu Phizo, who was then-President of the Naga National Council (NNC) and was in exile in London from 1956 till his death.
 The Liaison committee of Nagaland Peace Council (NPC) were represented by five church leaders like Longri Ao, M. Aram, L. Lungalang, Kenneth Kerhuo, and Lungshim Shaiza.

Discussions
There were a series of four discussions held with governor alone; at times, assisted by his advisors and Joint secretary of MHA. In all the four discussions held on 10 and 11 November 1975, the representatives from underground government and liaison committee participated.

Agreement details
The outcome of the discussions were compiled into three-point agreement, that ultimately came to be known as historic "Shillong Accord of 1975."

 The representatives of the underground organisations conveyed their decision, of their own volition, to accept, without condition, the Constitution of India.
 It was agreed that the arms, now underground, would be brought out and deposited at appointed places. Details for giving effect of this agreement will be worked out between them and representatives of the Government, the security forces, and members of the Liaison Committee.
 It was agreed that the representatives of the underground organisations should have reasonable time to formulate other issues for discussion for final settlement.

Signatory details
The "Shillong Accord" was signed on 11 November 1975 at Shillong, by the Governor of Nagaland L.P. Singh representing Indian government and the Nagaland's underground leadership represented by Kevi Yalie, M. Assa, S. Dahru, Veenyiyl Rhakho, and Z. Ramyo.

Supplementary Agreement
A supplementary agreement, detailing the process of depositing arms as per Clause 2 of Shillong Accord of 1975, was signed on 5 January 1976. The agreement included the implementation process of Clause 2, including the modalities for housing the underground members in peace camps.

 It was decided that the collection of arms, initially at collection centres, would commence as early as possible, and will be completed by 25 January 1976. Initial places of collection to be decided through discussion between Commissioner, representatives of underground organisations and the members of the Liaison Committee.
 Once all arms are collected, these will be handed over to Peace Council team at the respective places of collection.
 Peace Council team will arrange to transport the arms from collection centres to Chedema peace camp and arrange guards, etc., for safe custody of arms.
 Similar arrangement at agreed place/places will be made in Manipur with the concurrence of the Manipur Government.
 The underground may stay at peace camps to be established at suitable places, and their maintenance will be arranged only by the Peace Council. Any voluntary contribution from any source will be made to the Peace Council who will utilize the fund according to necessity.

Signatory details
The "Supplementary Agreement" was signed on 5 January 1976 at Shillong, by the Governor of Nagaland L.P. Singh representing Indian government and the Nagaland's underground leadership represented by Biseto Medom Keyho, Pukrove Nakhro, I. Temjenba, and Z. Ramyo.

Post-agreement consequences
The signing of Shillong Accord appears to have provided the final solution for the last twenty-years of conflict that inflicted suffering and neglect; accordingly, a large-scale of arms were surrendered, and the villagers enthusiastically participated in persuading the Naga underground rebels to come out and join the mainstream. The agreement also seems to be a victory for Indian government as Naga rebels agreed to accept the Indian constitution of their own volition, agreed to deposit the arms, and formulate other issues for discussions as part of final settlement.

Criticism
The detractors and critics of the Shillong Accord maintained that the Clause 3 that stated "reasonable time for the underground representatives to formulate other issues for discussion for the final settlement," still remained unimplemented -- as most of the Naga people and the Naga National Council(NNC) leaders abroad didn't agree to endorse the agreement. They even criticized saying that the agreement was signed by "representatives of the Naga underground," rather than the organizations like NNC or the Federal Government of Nagaland(FGN).

However, many Nagas, who were not reconciled being part of Indian union of states, condemned the agreement that ultimately created factionalism among the rebels. When the negotiations were going on before signing the agreement, it is said that Isak Chishi Swu, then-NNC Vice-president, and Thuingaleng Muivah, then-NNC General secretary, with 150 rebels were on their way back from China and Burma-Naga territory where they established their base. Some critics also point out that Phizo, then-NNC president and who was in exile from 1956 in London, neither endorsed nor renounced the agreement; though, his younger brother Kevi Yalley represented underground organizations and signed Shillong Accord. It is also believed that both Isak and Muivah tried their best to convince some of their colleagues, especially Phizo to condemn the agreement, including sending a seven-member delegation urging Phizo to condemn the Shillong Accord without delay; however, it looks Phizo remained silent and their voice went unheard.

Both Isak and Muivah after five years of signing the accord, decided to restore the damaged image of the NNC for having accepted the Indian constitution, openly rejected the agreement terming it as a "betrayal" by the NNC and censured it as a complete "sell-out" of the Naga rights, including derogatory remarks against Phizo, and swore to fight for unquestionable sovereignty; thus, the trio Muivah, Isaac and S. Khaplang created National Socialist Council of Nagaland(NSCN) breaking-up[abandoning] from their old organization NNC on 2 February 1980. NSCN, in spite of emerging as a strong rebel group, never enjoyed the popular support that NNC enjoyed at its peak. By 1988, NSCN was further splintered on tribal lines into two different factions—NSCN(K), under Khaplang leadership, and NSCN(IM), under Isak and Muivah leadership. After the death of Phizo on 30 April 1990 in London, NNC further splintered into two more factions—NNC(A), under Phizo's daughter Adino leadership, and NNC(K), led by previous NNC Vice-president Khodao Yanthan.

See also
 Naga people#Statehood, factions and ceasefires

References

External links
Full Text of Shillong Accord
Text of all peace accords for India
 Nagaland: The Beginning of Insurgency - II : The Shillong Accord
 HISTORY : SHILLONG ACCORD
 Going round the mulberry bush
 Insurgency in India's Northeast Cross-border Links and Strategic Alliances - Wasbir Hussain
 NNC condemns Shillong Accord
 The Unceasing Oozing Nagas Blood and Tears 
 Governing through Peace Accords – A Democratic Inquiry
 Tussle for Phek foothold	
 How can we help to speed up the Indo-Naga Peace Process
 ‘We’re not part of India, so we can’t be called secessionists’
 Insurgency in the North East

1975 in India
History of Nagaland
1970s in Nagaland
Treaties concluded in 1975
Internal treaties of India